"Used to Love U" is the debut single by American singer John Legend. It was written and produced by Legend and rapper-producer Kanye West for his debut album Get Lifted (2004). Released as Legend's debut single as well as the album's leading single in August 2004, the song reached number 30 in New Zealand and the United Kingdom as well as number 11 in the Flemish region of Belgium. "Used to Love U" also peaked at number 32 on the US Billboard Hot R&B/Hip-Hop Songs.

Music video
Directed by Ben Mor, the video begins with John taking his girlfriend to a church where a sermon is taking place. Through the girlfriend's point of view, we see that she's more interested with shiny jewelry than being with John. The sermon is held by Kanye West, backed by a choir, who gets John to play the piano. After playing the piano, John stands up and sings in front his girlfriend and his previous exes that are in the audience, saying that he's better off without them. Kat Graham of The Vampire Diaries fame appears towards the end of the video.

Track listings
CD single

Personnel
Credits adapted from the liner notes of Get Lifted.

Kanye West – producer
John Legend – co-producer, vocals, piano
Anthony Kilhoffer – engineer
Andy Manganello – engineer
Michael Peters – engineer
Mike Eleopoulos – assistant engineer
Pablo Arraya – assistant engineer
Val Brathwaite – assistant engineer

Manny Marroquin – mixing
Jared Robbins – assistant mix engineer
The Horn Dogs – horns
Printz Board – trumpet
Tim Izo – saxophone, flute
George Pajon – guitar
Miri Ben-Ari – strings

Charts

Release history

References

External links
 

2004 debut singles
John Legend songs
GOOD Music singles
Song recordings produced by Kanye West
Songs written by John Legend
2004 songs
Hip hop soul songs
Songs written by Kanye West